The  was a field army of the Imperial Japanese Army responsible for the defense of the Japanese home islands during the Pacific War. It was one of the regional commands in the Japanese home islands reporting to the General Defense Command.

Commanders

Commanding officer

Chief of Staff

See also
Armies of the Imperial Japanese Army

Further reading

Field armies of Japan
Military units and formations established in 1940
Military units and formations disestablished in 1945
1923 establishments in Japan